The Royal Marine Barracks, Chatham  was a military installation occupied by the Royal Marines and located at the Gun Wharf at Chatham in Kent. The barracks were situated immediately to the south of the Dockyard, just above the Ordnance Wharf. The barracks were closed in 1950 and demolished in 1960.

History
While there was a Royal Marine presence at Chatham Dockyard during the eighteen century, no barracks were available to house them, marines often being billeted at local inns and hotels. After an Admiralty decision in 1764 to provide accommodation for 500 marines, a site adjacent to the Gun Wharf (to the west) and the Dockyard (to the north) was purchased in 1777, with buildings completed and first occupied by the Royal Marines on 2 September 1779. Hill House (which had served as lodgings for the Navy Board and as the principal administrative building of the Dockyard from the sixteenth to the early eighteenth century) was demolished to make way for the barracks. The site was bounded by two alleyways: one to the north, running along the southern boundary of the Dockyard, which led from the road to the 'New Stairs' at the riverside; and the other to the south, named Church or Cat Lane.

Accommodation was in back-to-back barrack rooms, each accommodating 16 men, heated by a central stove (which originally was also used for cooking). The main barracks quadrangle was described in the 1850s: 'On entering the gate, the visitor sees a very elegant parallelogram, one side of which has a railing between it and the road; the two ends are occupied by officers' quarters, and the opposite side by a range of building, being the men's barrack'. Externally the three blocks were of similar appearance, each presenting a uniform front to the parade ground with windows equally spaced, and topped by a shallow roof behind a parapet. (The long range was later refashioned with a central pediment and clock). Behind the men's barrack the ground fell away towards the river (meaning that the building was of three storeys in front but four storeys to the rear). The rear of the building faced on to 'a narrower parallelogram, on the other side of which is a long narrow building, chiefly for store rooms' (originally this area contained just a simple wash room and privies). As originally built the barracks included an infirmary, outside the quadrangle (alongside the road at the south-east corner of the site); there was also a separate house for the Barrack-Master to the south-west, and a 'sutling house' linked to the officers' quarters to the north. 

The barracks were expanded considerably in the 1860s: the area to the south of Cat Lane, between the barracks and St Mary's Churchyard, was purchased and levelled off. The main barracks block was extended south as far as the new boundary, and a new block was built to form the southern end of the (now elongated) parade ground. Opposite the main block, backing on to the road, new quarters for Warrant Officers were added. At the opposite end of the site, to the north, a separate area of land was purchased from the Dockyard. This was used for a new range of officers' quarters, fronting on to the main road, which were built in 1867. The area behind was used for tennis courts and a rackets court, and in 1879 a 292-seat theatre, known as The Globe, was built here; it was used for lectures, concert parties and plays. By February 1894 a total of 7 officers and 1,049 non-commissioned officers and men were quartered there.

Melville Barracks
A further expansion took place in 1906 when the adjacent Melville Royal Naval Hospital, originally built between 1827 and 1828 and now closed, was acquired. This was reconstructed for use by the Royal Marines in 1905 and functioned as a barracks extension known as Melville Barracks.

Closure
The Royal Marine Barracks remained in use until 1950 when the Chatham Group, Royal Marines was disbanded, although the adjacent Melville Barracks continued to house parts of the Royal Marines Pay and Records Office until these barracks were closed in 1960. Both the Royal Marine and Melville Barracks were demolished in 1960. The site of the Royal Marine Barracks was subsequently sold to Lloyd's of London who built new offices, which were later acquired by Medway Council for their main offices and car park. The site of Melville Barracks was developed as council housing and is now known as Melville Court.

References

Barracks in England
Royal
Royal Marines bases